The 2002 Wyoming Cowboys football team represented the University of Wyoming in the 2002 NCAA Division I-A football season. The team's head coach was Vic Koenning, who was fired after the regular season. They played their home games at War Memorial Stadium in Laramie, Wyoming, and competed in the Mountain West Conference.

Schedule

Roster

References

Wyoming Cowboys
Wyoming Cowboys football seasons
Wyoming Cowboys football